The Dead Sleep Easy is a 2007 Canadian drama film, a co-production of Odessa Filmworks and Zed Filmworks produced on location in Guadalajara, Jalisco, Mexico. Its tagline is "When you're this far south, sometimes it's better to be dead than alive."

Plot
The story concerns a one-time Mexican wrestler known only as The Champ (Ian Hodgkinson) who becomes employed by a Mexican organised crime gang after he kills an opponent whose uncle is a mob leader. After witnessing a massacre of illegally smuggled migrants into the United States, The Champ decides to seek redress for this crime.

Cast

Distribution and release
The film has had numerous special screenings:

 22 September 2007: Calgary, Calgary International Film Festival
 8 February 2008: Victoria (British Columbia) Film Festival
 15 February 2008: Toronto
 22 February 2008: Ottawa
 13 March 2008: Montreal
 15 March 2008: Philadelphia, Pennsylvania, Backseat Film Festival
 20 March 2008: Dawson City, Yukon, International Short Film Festival
 27 March 28 March 2008: Hollywood, California, Ricardo Montalbán Theatre

The film was given a DVD release on 5 March 2009 through Anchor Bay Canada.

References

Bibliography
"Ana Sidel" official Ana Sidel site
 The Dead Sleep Easy official site
 Zed Filmworks: The Dead Sleep Easy profile
 
 
 
 
 Rue Morgue Radio: Lee Demarbre interview regarding The Dead Sleep Easy 8 February 2008
 
  
 Interview with director Lee DeMarbre

External links 
 
 

2007 films
Canadian drama films
English-language Canadian films
Films shot in Mexico
Lucha libre films
2007 drama films
2000s English-language films
Films directed by Lee Demarbre
2000s Canadian films